Kinfauns Castle West Lodge, also known as Rockdale Cottage, is a 19th-century gatehouse in Kinfauns, Perth and Kinross, Scotland. A Category C listed building, it was completed in 1826, the work of Robert Smirke.

The gatehouse originally had four octagonal gate piers (capped by a pair of draped shields at centre and a pair of lions on the outermost piers) across its driveway immediately to the west, but one of each has since been removed, along with other alterations having been made to the building itself. The sculptor of the pier heads was John Cochrane.

References

Category C listed buildings in Perth and Kinross
Houses in Perth and Kinross
Gatehouses (architecture)
1826 establishments in Scotland